The canton of Arras-1 is an administrative division of the Pas-de-Calais department, in northern France. It was created at the French canton reorganisation which came into effect in March 2015. Its seat is in Arras.

It consists of the following communes: 

Acq 
Anzin-Saint-Aubin
Arras (partly)
Beaumetz-lès-Loges
Dainville
Écurie
Étrun
Marœuil
Mont-Saint-Éloi
Neuville-Saint-Vaast
Roclincourt
Sainte-Catherine
Wailly

References

Cantons of Pas-de-Calais